Frank Austin may refer to:
Frank Austin (footballer) (1933–2004), English footballer
Frankie Austin (1917–1960), Panamanian baseball player
Frank Austin and the Frost brothers
Frank P. Austin (1937–2002), interior designer and antique dealer
Frank Austin (actor) (1877–1954), American actor
Frank Austin (artist), Navajo American painter and textile artist
Frank Lyman Austin (1874–1942), American architect
Frank Austin, pseudonym for Max Brand (Frederick Schiller Faust, 1892–1944)

See also
Francis Austin (disambiguation)
Francis Austen (1774–1865), Royal Navy officer